More Shine is New York band Si*Sé's second album, released on 27 September 2005.

Track listing
"Sometimes" - 4:53
"The Truth" - 3:54
"More Shine" - 5:26
"A la Bahia" - 1:39
"Amiga" - 4:20
"Agua" - 4:31
"Brazillion" - 1:47
"Changes" - 4:54
"Wanna Know" - 4:48
"Mariposa En Havana" - 4:36
"Karma" - 4:59
"Noche Azul" - 2:39

References

Si*Sé albums
2005 albums